Agoniatites is a genus of primitive ammonoids belonging to the order Agoniatitida family Agoniatitidae.

Species of this genus were fast-moving nektonic carnivore shelled ammonoids. They lived in the Eifelian and Givetian ages of the middle Devonian period, which occurred 385.3-397.5 million years ago.

Vanuxemi agoniatites is a rare species in this group which is the only ammonoid found in the Hamilton Group (Mahantango Formation) in Pennsylvania and New York.

Fossil distribution
Devonian of Algeria, Canada (Northwest Territories), the Czech Republic, Morocco, Russia, United States (Alaska, Nevada, New York, Pennsylvania)

Species
 Agoniatites annulatus
 Agoniatites bicanaliculatus
 Agoniatites costulatus
 Agoniatites kayseri Wedekind
 Agoniatites nodiferus Hall
 Agoniatites obliquus Whidborne
 Agoniatites occultus
 Agoniatites vanuxemi

Gallery

References
Zipcodezoo
Biolib
The Paleobiology Database
Sepkoski, Jack  Sepkoski's Online Genus Database – Cephalopodes
 Wikimedia Commons

Agoniatitida
Middle Devonian ammonites
Devonian ammonites of North America
Paleozoic life of the Northwest Territories